Avalon, Australia may refer to:

 Avalon, New South Wales, Australia
 Avalon, Victoria, Australia
 Avalon Airport, Victoria, Australia
 Australian International Airshow, sometimes called the Avalon Airshow after its hosting airport